The 1945 Little All-America college football team is composed of college football players from small colleges and universities who were selected by the Associated Press (AP) as the best players at each position. The selection of Little All-America teams was interrupted by World War II; the 1945 selections were the first since 1942. Two linemen from the Orange Bowl champion 1945 Miami Hurricanes football team made the team. Due to Miami's postwar expansion plans, the AP opined that the school would likely not qualify in the future for Little All-America consideration.

First team
Back - Carroll Bowen, Catawba
Back - Walt Trojanowski, Connecticut
Back - James Boswell, Oberlin
Back - Walt Schlinkman, Texas Tech
End - Theodore Molitor, St. Thomas
End - Robert Eyer, Lock Haven Teachers
Tackle - Thomas Stewart, Chattanooga
Tackle - Robert Kirkman, Dakota Wesleyan
Guard - Andy Kavaounis, Presbyterian
Guard - Ed Cameron, Miami (FL)
Center - William Levett, Miami (FL)

See also
 1945 College Football All-America Team

References

Little All-America college football team
Little All-America college football teams